The East India Docks were a group of docks in Blackwall, east London, north-east of the Isle of Dogs. Today only the entrance basin and listed perimeter wall remain visible.

History

Early history

Following the successful creation of the West India Docks which opened in 1802, an Act of Parliament in 1803 set up the East India Dock Company, promoted by the Honourable East India Company. Joseph Cotton was chairman of the Dock Company from 1803. The foundation stone was laid on 11 March 1805 and the sluices of its floating gate opened on 26 July 1806, being ready to receive ships five days later.

The docks, designed by engineer Ralph Walker, were located to the north-east of the West India Docks. They were based on the existing Brunswick Dock, which had been used for fitting out and repairing ships as part of Blackwall Yard. The Brunswick Dock, which had originally been connected directly to the Thames to the south, became the Export Dock. To the north the company built a larger  Import Dock. Both were connected to the Thames via an eastern entrance basin.

The company rapidly became profitable through its trade in commodities such as tea, spices, indigo, silk and Persian carpets. The tea trade alone was worth £30 million a year. The docks spawned further local industry, with spice merchants and pepper grinders setting up around the dock to process goods.

In 1838 the two companies merged to form the East and West India Docks Company. In 1886, in the last act of a ruinous game of leapfrog with the London & St Katharine Dock Company, they built the Tilbury Docks. The East and West India Docks Company operated in cooperation with the London & St Katharine Dock Company from 1888, and the two companies merged as the London and India Docks Company on 1 January 1901. On 31 March 1909 the docks were taken over by the Port of London Authority, along with the other enclosed docks. 

While much smaller than the West India Docks or the later Royal Docks, the East India Docks could still handle East Indiamen of 1,000 tons and up to 250 ships at one time. However the advent of steam power and larger ships reduced the importance of this dock. The docks played a key role in the Second World War as a location for constructing the floating Mulberry harbours used by the Allies to support the D-Day landings in France.

After the war, during which all the docks were badly damaged, the East India Docks were confined to occasional Channel Islands traffic and to the maintenance of equipment including dredgers.

Brunswick Wharf Power Station, a monumental brick structure with fluted concrete chimneys, was built on the site of the Export Dock in stages between 1946 and 1956; it has since been decommissioned and demolished.

From the 1960s onwards, the East India Docks experienced a steady decline – as did all of London's other docks – as the shipping industry adopted containerisation, which effectively moved traffic downstream to Tilbury. In 1967 the East India Docks were the first of the London docks to close.

Layout

Redevelopment

In the late 20th century the docks were mostly filled in and only the entrance basin remains, as a wildlife refuge and an attractive local amenity. Since 1994 the area has been served by its own Docklands Light Railway East India station.

Developments on the site of the Import Dock include the Mulberry Place in 1992 and the Republic campus with offices, retail and public space which was largely completed in 2019. Two buildings on the campus have been renamed as Import and Export to provide a nod to the site's past. The names of the streets on the site of the Import Dock reflect the names of some of the goods traded here: Clove Crescent, Nutmeg Lane, Coriander Avenue, Oregano Drive, Rosemary Drive and Saffron Avenue.

Meanwhile the site of the Export Dock was converted for residential use with an amenity with mature trees known as Virginia Quay Park.

References

Further reading

 

London docks
History of the London Borough of Tower Hamlets
Buildings and structures in the London Borough of Tower Hamlets
Geography of the London Borough of Tower Hamlets
British East India Company
Port of London
Poplar, London